The Unbroken Circle: The Musical Heritage of the Carter Family is a 2004 compilation album featuring various artists performing the work of country music pioneers The Carter Family.

Recording and release
The album was assembled and produced by John Carter Cash, shortly after the 2003 deaths of June Carter Cash and Johnny Cash. The compilation includes a track from the former's sessions for Wildwood Flower, as well as Johnny Cash's final recording.

Reception
The editorial staff at AllMusic Guide gave the compilation three out of five stars, with reviewer Ronnie D. Lankford, Jr., writing that the first several tracks are low points, but that several subsequent recordings are high quality, particularly Marty Stuart's cover of "Never Let the Devil Get the Upper Hand of You" and the version of "Little Moses" on this album that "sounds more old-time than the Carter Family". PopMatters noted that this is "as good as a tribute album can be", commenting on the quality of John Carter Cash's musical direction, the album packaging, and sums up the assessment as "a reverent, well-executed, at times excellent, at times flawed, but always enjoyable, tribute album".

Track listing
All songs written by A. P. Carter
"Worried Man Blues" by George Jones – 3:12
"No Depression in Heaven" by Sheryl Crow – 3:21
"On the Sea of Galilee" by Emmylou Harris featuring The Peasall Sisters – 3:17
"Engine One-Forty-Three" by Johnny Cash – 3:39
"Never Let the Devil Get the Upper Hand of You" by Marty Stuart & His Fabulous Superlatives – 4:51
"Little Moses" by Janette Carter and Joe Carter – 2:19
"Black Jack David" by Norman Blake and Nancy Blake featuring Tim O’Brien – 2:56
"Bear Creek Blues" by John Prine – 4:24
"You Are My Flower" by Willie Nelson – 2:39
"Single Girl, Married Girl" by Shawn Colvin featuring Earl Scruggs and Randy Scruggs – 2:20
"Will My Mother Know Me There?" by The Whites featuring Ricky Skaggs – 3:04
"The Winding Stream" by Rosanne Cash – 4:31
"Rambling Boy" by The Del McCoury Band – 4:24
"Hold Fast to the Right" by June Carter Cash – 2:55
"Gold Watch and Chain" by The Nitty Gritty Dirt Band featuring Kris Kristofferson – 4:06

Personnel
Technical personnel
Wayne Brezinka – art direction, layout, design, cover illustration
John Carter Cash – compilation; production on all tracks, except "No Depression in Heaven"; art direction
Jim DeMain – mastering at Yes Master
David McClister – photography (except Shawn Colvin)
Frank Ockenfels – photography of Shawn Colvin
Mark Petaccia – assistant mixing
Chuck Turner – engineering and mixing at Quad Studios, Nashville, Tennessee, United States, except for "Engine One-Forty-Three" (engineering only)

"Worried Man Blues"
George Jones – vocals
Laura Cash – fiddle
Dennis Crouch – double bass
Kenny Malone – membranophone
Kayton Roberts – steel guitar
Pete Wade – acoustic and electric guitar

"No Depression in Heaven"
Sheryl Crow – lead vocals, acoustic guitar, production
Larry Campbell – acoustic guitar, fiddle, and backing vocals
Roy Hendrickson – engineering
Tim Smith – bass guitar
Peter Stroud – acoustic guitar

"On the Sea of Galilee"
Emmylou Harris – acoustic guitar, lead vocals
Sam Bush – mandolin
Billy Linneman – double bass
The Peasall Sisters – vocals
Randy Scruggs – acoustic guitar

"Engine One-Forty-Three"
Johnny Cash – vocals
John Carter Cash – production, mixing
Laura Cash – fiddle
Dennis Crouch – double bass
Pat McLaughlin – mandolin
Randy Scruggs – acoustic guitar

"Never Let the Devil Get the Upper Hand of You"
Marty Stuart – electric sitar, mandolin, and lead vocals
Laura Cash – fiddle
Brian Glenn – bass guitar and backing vocals
Harry Stinson – membranophone and backing vocals
Kenny Vaughan – acoustic guitar

"Little Moses"
Janette Carter – autoharp and vocals
Joe Carter – vocals
Laura Cash – acoustic guitar
Dale Jett – acoustic guitar

"Black Jack David"
Nancy Blake – acoustic guitar, cello, and vocals
Norman Blake – acoustic guitar and vocals
John Carter Cash – autoharp
Laura Cash – fiddle
Tim O’Brien – bouzouki and vocals

"Bear Creek Blues"
John Prine – acoustic guitar and lead vocals
Dave Jacques – bass guitar
Pat McLaughlin – acoustic guitar, mandolin, and percussion
Jason Wilber – electric guitar and backing vocals

"You Are My Flower"
Willie Nelson – acoustic guitar and vocals
Boo McCleod – assistant engineering

"Single Girl, Married Girl"
Shawn Colvin – vocals
Fred Remmert – engineering
Earl Scruggs – acoustic guitar
Randy Scruggs – acoustic guitar

"Will My Mother Know Me There?"
Buck White – mandolin, piano, vocals
Cheryl White – acoustic guitar and vocals
Sharon White – acoustic guitar and vocals
Ricky Skaggs – acoustic guitar

"The Winding Stream"
Rosanne Cash – lead vocals
Lorrie Carter Bennett – backing vocals
Dennis Crouch – double bass
Pat McLaughlin – mandolin
Randy Scruggs – acoustic guitar

"Rambling Boy"
Mike Bub – double bass
Jason Carter – fiddle
Del McCoury – acoustic guitar and lead vocals
Rob McCoury – banjo
Ronnie McCoury – mandolin and background vocals

"Hold Fast to the Right"
June Carter Cash – lead vocals
Norman Blake – acoustic guitar
Johnny Cash – backing vocals
Laura Cash – acoustic guitar

"Gold Watch and Chain"
Bob Carpenter – accordion and background vocals
Jimmie Fadden – harmonica and membranophone
Jeff Hanna – acoustic guitar and vocals
Jimmy Ibbotson – electric bass guitar and vocals
John McEuen – acoustic guitar and banjo
Kris Kristofferson – acoustic guitar and vocals

See also
List of 2004 albums

References

External links

2004 compilation albums
Albums produced by John Carter Cash
Country music compilation albums
Dualtone Records compilation albums
Cash–Carter family